Peter Faber (1506–1546), a French Jesuit co-founder of the Society of Jesus.

 Peter Faber may also refer to:

 Pierre Favre (musician) (born 1937), jazz drummer
 Peter Faber (actor) (born 1943), Dutch film and television actor
 Peter Faber (telegraph specialist) (1810–1877), Danish songwriter, photographer and telegraphy expert